The HP Xpander (F1903A) aka "Endeavour" was to be Hewlett-Packard's newest graphing calculator in 2002, but the project was cancelled in November 2001 months before it was scheduled to go into production. It had both a keyboard and a pen-based interface, measured 162.6 mm by 88.9 mm by 22.9 mm, with a large grayscale screen, and ran on two rechargeable AA batteries. It had a semi-translucent green cover on a gray case and an expansion slot.

The underlying operating system was Windows CE 3.0. It had 8 MB RAM, 16 MB ROM, a geometry application, a 240×320 display, a Hitachi SH3 processor, and e-lessons. One of the obvious omissions in the Xpander was the lack of a computer algebra system (CAS).

Math Xpander

After discontinuing the Xpander, HP decided to release the Xpander software, named the Math Xpander, as a free-of-charge application that ran on Windows CE-based Pocket PC devices. It was hosted by Saltire Software, who had been involved in its design.

See also
 List of Hewlett-Packard products: Pocket calculators
 HP calculators
 Casio ClassPad 300 — a similar device by Casio
 TI PLT SHH1
 HP Jornada X25

References

External links
HP Xpander at hpmuseum.org
HP Xpander at hpcalc.org
HP Xpander at rskey.org
HP Xpander at evilmadscientist.com
Math Xpander user's guide

Graphing calculators
Windows CE devices
xpander